Insulin induced gene 1, also known as INSIG1, is a protein which in humans is encoded by the INSIG1 gene.

INSIG1 is short for insulin-induced gene 1; it is located on chromosome 7 (7q36). This human gene encodes for a transmembrane protein of 277 amino acids with probably 6 transmembrane domains. It is localized in the endoplasmic reticulum (ER) and seems to be expressed in all tissues, especially in liver. This gene is called an insulin-induced gene because the molecule insulin can regulate it. Importantly, the protein encoded by this gene plays a critical role in regulating cholesterol concentrations in cells.

Function 

INSIG1 plays an important role in the SREBP-mediated regulation of cholesterol biosynthesis: by binding to the sterol-sensing domain of SCAP (SREBP cleavage activating protein) it makes the SCAP/SREBP complex stay longer in the ER, thus prohibiting SCAP from carrying activated SREBP to the golgi complex. This ultimately blocks SREBP from acting as a transcription factor for the SRE in the promoter region of the HMG-CoA-reductase gene and results in a decreased expression of HMG-CoA-reductase.
INSIG1 also binds to the sterol-sensing domain of HMG-CoA-reductase, resulting in the enzyme's increased degradation.

Both functions require the binding of INSIG1 protein via the same site.

There are two other proteins whose sterol-binding sites show a great similarity to the ones of SCAP and HMG-CoA-reductase and who might thus be regulated by INSIG1 as well:
Niemann-Pick disease type C1 protein, which participates in the intracellular movement of cholesterol
Patched, the receptor for Hedgehog, a protein that contains covalently bound cholesterol

Oxysterols regulate cholesterol homeostasis through liver X receptor (LXR) and sterol regulatory element-binding protein (SREBP) mediated signaling pathway. This protein binds to the sterol-sensing domains of SREBP cleavage-activating protein (SCAP) and HMG CoA reductase, and is essential for the sterol-mediated trafficking of the two proteins. Alternatively spliced transcript variants encoding distinct isoforms have been observed.

Regulation 
INSIG1 is regulated by insulin and highly expressed in liver.

Sequence (277 AA) 
 MPRLHDHFWS CSCAHSARRR GPPRASTAGL PPKVGEMINV SVSGPSLLAA HGAPDADPAP RGRSAAMSGP EPGSPYPNTW HHRLLQRSLV LFSVGVVLAL VLNLLQIQRN VTLFPEEVIA TIFSSAWWVP PCCGTAAAVV GLLYPCIDSH LGEPHKFKRE WASVMRCIAV FVGINHASAK LDFANNVQLS LTLAALSLGL WWTFDRSRSG LGLGITIAFL ATLITQFLVY NGVYQYTSPD FLYIRSWLPC IFFSGGVTVG NIGRQLAMGV PEKPHSD

Synonyms 
CL-6, INSIG-1, Insulin-induced gene 1 protein, MGC1405 (source: iHOP)

Interactions 

INSIG1 has been shown to interact with SREBF2.

References

Further reading

External links 
 Uniprot description of INSIG1
 Bioinformatic Harvester entry of INSIG1